If not otherwise stated, the virological status of sample pools is evaluated through PCR tests.

Screening strategies

General population

Campus screening strategies 

SUNY campuses are implementing a pool testing strategy based on saliva samples, including Cornell, SUNY Fredonia or SUNY Oneonta.

The University of Tennessee is also implementing a saliva pool testing strategy.

Researchers from Yale University, Georgia Augusta University,
the University of Illinois,
are also considering or implementing pool testing strategies.

Small-scale screening or experimental protocols

References

See also 
 Group testing
 COVID-19 testing

Design of experiments
pool testing strategy